Figure skating at the 2014 Winter Olympics was held at the Iceberg Skating Palace in Sochi, Russia. The five events took place between 6–22 February 2014. For the first time at the Winter Olympics, a figure skating team event was held.

Records and firsts

The following new ISU best scores were set during this competition:

Other records and firsts:

 Yuzuru Hanyu (JPN) set a new world record in the men's short program with a score of 101.45 points, the first score to break the 100 points barrier in the short program.
 Adelina Sotnikova's gold medal was Russia's first Olympic gold in the ladies event, making Russia the first country to have won Olympic gold medals in all four figure skating disciplines. Also, in winning the team trophy, Russia became the first nation to win gold medals in all five events.
 For the first time, in the men's singles event, all three of the medalists in an Olympic figure skating event were of Asian descent.
 Yuzuru Hanyu's gold medal was Japan's first Olympic gold in the men's event. It was also the first time that the men's event had been won by an Asian athlete.
 Meryl Davis and Charlie White won the first Olympic gold medal for the U.S. in ice dance.
 Denis Ten's bronze medal was Kazakhstan's first Olympic medal in figure skating.
 Carolina Kostner's bronze medal was Italy's first Olympic medal in a singles event.
 Evgeni Plushenko (RUS) tied the record of four Olympic figure skating medals (Gillis Grafström won four in the early years of the sport, in 1920–1932).
 Yulia Lipnitskaya (RUS) became the youngest Olympic gold medalist in figure skating under modern rules. She also became the youngest Olympic gold medalist in the teams discipline. Lipnitskaya was the second-youngest all-time figure skating gold medalist, behind Maxi Herber (pairs skater), who would have been too young to compete at the Olympics under modern rules.

Competition schedule
The following is the competition schedule for all five events.

All times are (UTC+4).

Medal summary

Medal table

Events

 *Indicates the athlete(s) only competed in the short program/dance.
 **Indicates the athlete(s) only competed in the long program/dance.

Controversies

Athlete selection 
The United States' selection of Ashley Wagner over Mirai Nagasu for the Olympic team caused some controversy as Nagasu finished ahead of Wagner at the 2014 U.S. Championships. The results at the pre-Olympic nationals often play a major role in the decision process but U.S. Figure Skating never stated that they would be the only results considered. Wagner was selected on the body of her work, instead of her performance at that event.

This was the first time that U.S. Figure Skating selected a skater who had competed in the pre-Olympic nationals and lost over another on who had also competed. On previous occasions, this was done for skaters who had been injured and unable to compete at nationals.

The selection of Evgeni Plushenko by the Russia Olympic Team for figure skating caused some controversy, as he had been beaten by Maxim Kovtun at the 2014 Russian Figure Skating Championships. Plushenko said he won’t participate in European Championships and will give spot at men's singles for Kovtun and he will participate in the team event only. ISU president Ottavio Cinquanta cautioned the Figure Skating Federation of Russia, "If one of your skaters has sustained the same injury for years. You should not enter him or her." Plushenko skated strongly in the Short and Free Programs for the Team Event, however in the Men's individuals he withdrew right before the start of the Short Program which left host Russia without an entry since it was too late have Kovtun as a replacement. Russian figure skating officials defended the initial selection of Plushenko by noting that Kovtun had done poorly at international events.

Allegations of votes swapping 
French sports newspaper L'Équipe, quoting an anonymous Russian coach, alleged that Russia and the United States would swap votes, with the U.S. voting for Russian athletes in pairs figure skating and team events and Russia voting for the U.S. in ice dance. The allegations were categorically denied by U.S. Figure Skating.

Ladies' singles figure skating results 
Immediately after the final scores were announced, confirming Russia's victory, journalistic questions arose regarding whether Russian 17-year-old Adelina Sotnikova's performances deserved higher scores than the performances of 23-year-old Yuna Kim from South Korea. Questions over the judges, the judging system, and the anonymity of scores were also raised in the press.

Official responses 
On 21 February 2014, the International Skating Union (ISU) issued a statement which asserted all rules and procedures were applied during the competition and that no official protest had been filed by any participating nation concerning the results of the competition. Such a protest must be done within 30 minutes of the event.

ISU's 21 February 2014 statement declaring their confidence "in the high quality and integrity of the ISU judging system". Adding "judges were selected by random drawing from a pool of 13 potential judges" and all nine judges on the free skating panel were from different nations.

On 10 April, the Korean Olympic Committee (KOC) and the Korean Skating Union (KSU) filed an official complaint with the ISU Disciplinary Commission (DC) concerning judging. The complaint was regarding "the wrongful constitution of the panel of judges and the unjust outcome of the competition". It requested that the DC conduct a thorough investigation, "take appropriate disciplinary actions against the concerned individuals", and institute corrective actions. On 14 April, the DC ruled the complaint inadmissible because a general request for investigation is not within DC's jurisdiction and the complaint was not addressed at an individual or federation as required.

On 30 April, the KOC and KSU filed a second official complaint with the DC. This time the complaint was against Alla Shekhovtsova and Figure Skating Federation of Russia (FSFR), specifically citing a hug Shekhovtsova shared with Sotnikova and Shekhovtsova's marriage to the current Director General of the FSFR. On 30 May, the DC dismissed the complaint. It ruled Shekhovtsova "is not responsible for the judging panel's composition", her marriage did not create a conflict of interest, and since Sotnikova initiated the hug, Shekhovtsova did not break any rules by responding.

As of June 2014, the KOC and KSU are considering appealing to the Court of Arbitration for Sport (CAS).

Opinions 
USA Today reported "A high-ranking Olympic figure skating official … said the geographic makeup of the judging panel 'was clearly slanted towards … Sotnikova.'" The free skating panel included two Russian officials, a Russian judge and a Ukrainian judge. Journalists questioned the appointments of Russian judge Alla Shekhovtsova, the wife of the former president and the current general director of Figure Skating Federation of Russia Valentin Piseev, and Ukrainian judge Yuri Balkov, who was suspended for a year after being caught on tape attempting to fix the ice dancing competition at the 1998 Winter Olympics. The technical panel, that oversees correct execution of elements, is headed by fellow Russian Alexander Lakernik. Shekhovtseva was photographed hugging Sotnikova in the arena, raising another question of bias. The detailed score sheet shows that one judge gave Adelina Sotnikova +3 grade of execution (GOE) on all except two elements. In contrast, the score sheet of short program shows that one judge gave Yuna Kim +0 grade of execution on her triple flip, of which the NBC commentator Tracy Wilson commented as 'another perfect flip'.

Journalists and experts argued that scores given to Adelina Sotnikova were inflated both in the short and long programs. She was inexplicably scored above all others in the free program, where most believed she merited only 4th place in the phase behind Yuna, Mao Asada, and Carolina Kostner. Many among them cite that certain judges gave generous scores along with fellow Russian competitor Yulia Lipnitskaya. In particular, numerous +3 grade of executions were handed out to the two Russian skaters as well as nods in component scores compared to other skaters. Others noted that Sotnikova made a mistake by stepping out of one of her jumps which got a -0.9 grade of execution in the scorecards. Ryan Bradley, 2011 US champion, asked "Are we just going to ignore that she botched the landing of her 3 jump and pretend she was perfect?" There are also debates about whether Sotnikova's triple lutz had a wrong edge on takeoff and the triple toe loop in her first jumping pass was under-rotated. Neither error was flagged by the event's technical panel.  Retired national-level figure skater Tim Gerber wrote a letter to the ISU, claiming that Sotnikova's triple triple combination jump should have received wrong edge and under rotation. Gerber also asserted that the step sequence levels were not correctly awarded for Kim and Sotnikova. He stated that Kim's step sequence should have received a level four (instead of three) and Sotnikova's step sequence should have received a level three (instead of four), as Sotnikova's step sequence elements in free skating didn't meet the requirements to get level four, and Kim's met the requirements enough to get level four.

Katarina Witt, a two-time Olympic champion, stated "I am stunned by this result, I don’t understand the scoring." Several experts have also pointed out how Kim and Kostner's programs have significantly better artistry, choreography and skill on ice that should translate to higher component marks to other skaters. One judge in the scoresheets gave out significantly lower marks to Kim and Kostner in the component marks. Sonia Garbato, seven-time Olympic figure skating judge and former high-ranking ISU official, wrote: "No fair judge … could have awarded to Adelina higher marks in choreography, performance/execution, and interpretation of the music." Four-time world champion Kurt Browning also expressed his surprise at the results, declaring that he did not understand how Kim and Sotnikova could have been so close in the programme component scores. He also pointed out how Sotnikova had her component scores boosted compared to her previous programs  Michael Weiss, a two-time world bronze medalist, wrote "couldn't disagree more that Yuna and Sotnikova had basically same Component marks?..in Both short & long? Home field inflation."  Dick Button, two-time Olympic champion and longstanding skating analyst, commented: "Sotnikova was energetic, strong, commendable, but not a complete skater."

A petition in Change.org against the results of the event demanding an investigation and rejudgment has amassed over 2 million supporters breaking several web traffic records on the website.

Qualification 

A total of 148 quota spots are available to athletes to compete at the games. A maximum of 18 athletes could be entered by a National Olympic Committee, with a maximum of 9 men or 9 women. An additional six quota spots were made available for the team event. A further ten team trophy quotas (two in each discipline) were distributed to countries qualifying for the team event, but not the discipline itself. This means up to a maximum of 158 athletes could partake.

Participating nations
149 athletes from 30 nations participated, with number of athletes in parentheses. Brazil and the Philippines made their Olympic debuts in the sport.

References

External links
 Sochi 2014 Figure Skating page
 Official Results Book – Figure Skating
 2014 Winter Olympics page at the International Skating Union
 

 
2014
2014 Winter Olympics events
Winter Olympics
International figure skating competitions hosted by Russia